Citizenship Counts is a non-partisan 501(c)(3) organization based in Arizona.

History
In October 2004, Gerda Weissmann Klein was asked to speak at a naturalization ceremony that was hosted by Three Rivers Middle School in Cleves, Ohio.

Klein shared her experience with her granddaughter, Alysa Ullman Cooper, and her friend, Rita Schaefer, then President of McDougal Littell, a publisher of educational materials for middle- and high-school students. After learning that Klein and Ullman were invited to attend a special naturalization ceremony at the White House, Schaefer encouraged Ullman to author a civics-based curriculum about the naturalization process. In February 2008, The Path to Citizenship was published, and in August 2008, Citizenship Counts was founded to implement the program in schools across the United States.

On March 23, 2009, the inaugural naturalization ceremony under the stewardship of Citizenship Counts was held at the Phoenix Convention Center. Fifty new citizens from twenty-six countries took the "Oath of Allegiance," which was administered by former Supreme Court Justice Sandra Day O’Connor.

Board members
Citizenship Counts has a variety of educational, political, business, and community leaders who serve on its advisory or governing boards.

Advisory board
 The Honorable Sandra Day O'Connor, retired U.S. Supreme Court Justice
 Kirk Ankeney, Executive Director for Curriculum and Instruction for the San Diego Unified School District
 Dr. Jesus Garcia, former President of the National Council for the Social Studies
 Carlos M. Gutierrez, former United States Secretary of Commerce 35th Secretary of the U.S. Department of Commerce
 Sam Harris, former President of Northbrook United Way of America, author and Holocaust survivor
 Benjamin Johnson, Executive Director of the American Immigration Lawyers Association
 Thomas H. Kirk, Jr., former Deputy Commander of Special Forces in Europe
 Carrie Martz, former CEO and Founder of The Martz Agency
 Ted McConnell, Executive Director of the Campaign for the Civic Mission of Schools
 Marney Murphy
 Jason Steinagle

Board of Directors
Roger Cohen 
Dr. Eric Mondschein
Syd Golston
Don Streets
Jim Ullman

References

Charities based in Arizona
Organizations established in 2008
Community building